A number of different minor league baseball teams have played in San Francisco, California from 1878 through the arrival of the Major League San Francisco Giants in 1958. The most notable team was the San Francisco Seals of the Pacific Coast League but prior to their formation in 1903 a number of teams operated primarily in the California League and its various predecessors and offshoots, including multiple teams in the same league at various times.

External links
Baseball Reference

Baseball teams in San Francisco
 01
Defunct baseball teams in California
Defunct California League teams
Defunct California State League teams
Defunct Pacific Coast League teams
Defunct Central California League teams
Defunct New California League teams
Defunct California Players League teams
1878 establishments in California
Baseball teams established in 1878
1910 disestablishments in California
Baseball teams disestablished in 1910